Hugh Frazer may refer to:

 Hugh Carroll Frazer (1891–1975), United States naval officer and Medal of Honor recipient
 Hugh Frazer (artist) (1795–1865), Irish landscape and genre painter

See also
 Hugh Fraser (disambiguation)